Wu Jichuan (born October 1937) is a Chinese politician who served as minister of posts and telecommunications from 1993 to 1998 and minister of information industry from 1998 to 2003.

He was a delegate to the 8th, 9th, and 10th National People's Congress. He was an alternate member of the 14th Central Committee of the Chinese Communist Party and a member of the 15th Central Committee of the Chinese Communist Party.

Biography
Wu was born in Changning County (now Changning), Hunan, in October 1937. In 1956, he entered Beijing University of Posts and Telecommunications, majoring in telegraphic communication. After graduation, he stayed and worked at the university.

He joined the Chinese Communist Party (CCP) in July 1960. He moved up the ranks to become vice minister in October 1984 and minister in March 1993, interspersed with short terms as deputy party secretary of Henan from June 1990 to February 1993. In March 1998, he became , a post he kept until March 2003. 

In March 2003, he took office as vice chairperson of the National People's Congress Education, Science, Culture and Public Health Committee.

Personal life
He married Gong Shuangjin, a communication transmission expert who gave birth to two daughters.

References

1937 births
Living people
People from Changning, Hunan
Beijing University of Posts and Telecommunications alumni
Peking University alumni
People's Republic of China politicians from Hunan
Chinese Communist Party politicians from Hunan
Delegates to the 8th National People's Congress
Delegates to the 9th National People's Congress
Delegates to the 10th National People's Congress
Alternate members of the 14th Central Committee of the Chinese Communist Party
Members of the 15th Central Committee of the Chinese Communist Party